Leucorhynchia caledonica is a species of sea snail, a marine gastropod mollusk in the family Skeneidae.

Description
The diameter of the shell is 3 mm. The polished, shining, whitish shell has a subdiscoidal shape and is slightly convex above and below. The spire contains 3 flattened whorls that are rapidly increasing. The periphery is carinate. The simple peristome is continuous and is thickened at the base and produced into a tongue-like callus past the umbilicus, leaving a perforation between it and the columellar wall.

Distribution
This marine species occurs in the Western Pacific Ocean, off the Philippines, Indo-Malaysia, New Caledonia and Queensland, Australia; in the Indian Ocean off Réunion.

References

 Crosse, H. 1867. Description d'un genre nouveau et de plusieurs espèces inédites provenant de la Nouvelle-Calédonie. Journal de Conchyliologie 15: 312-321
 Iredale, T. 1929. Queensland molluscan notes, No. 1. Memoirs of the Queensland Museum 9(3): 261-297, pls 30-31
 Cotton, B.C. 1959. South Australian Mollusca. Archaeogastropoda. Handbook of the Flora and Fauna of South Australia. Adelaide : South Australian Government Printer 449 pp
 Higo, S., Callomon, P. & Goto, Y. (1999) Catalogue and Bibliography of the Marine Shell-Bearing Mollusca of Japan. Elle Scientific Publications, Yao, Japan, 749 pp

External links
 To World Register of Marine Species
 

caledonica
Gastropods described in 1967